Raphitoma farolita is a species of sea snail, a marine gastropod mollusk in the family Raphitomidae.

Description

Distribution
This marine species occurs in the Mediterranean Sea off the Baleares.

References

 Nordsieck F. (1977). The Turridae of the European seas. Roma: La Conchiglia. 131 pp.

External links
 Giannuzzi-Savelli R., Pusateri F. & Bartolini S. (2018). A revision of the Mediterranean Raphitomidae (Gastropoda: Conoidea) 5: loss of planktotrophy and pairs of species, with the description of four new species. Bollettino Malacologico. 54, supplement 11: 1-77. page(s): 26, figs 30, 31B
 Biolib.cz: Raphitoma farolita

farolita
Gastropods described in 1977